The Storm Breaker is a 1925 American silent drama film directed by Edward Sloman and written by Edward T. Lowe Jr. It is based on the 1922 novel Titans by Charles Guernon. The film stars House Peters Sr., Ruth Clifford, Nina Romano, Ray Hallor, Jere Austin, and Lionel Belmore. The film was released on October 25, 1925, by Universal Pictures.

Plot
As described in a film magazine review, John Strong, a dominatingly strong willed fisherman who is loved by a young woman who lives in his mother’s home meets and marries the daughter of a bookseller, but then loses her love to his brother Neil. One night a storm wrecks his brother’s boat. He refuses to go to the rescue until he is told that he is the only man on the coast who can save the one who is in peril. Following the successful rescue of his brother, he realizes he has no right to the love of the woman he has wed. He leaves the village, but not before he learns that the young woman who adored him before he was married will await his return.

Cast         
House Peters Sr. as John Strong
Ruth Clifford as Lysette DeJon
Nina Romano as Judith Nyte
Ray Hallor as Neil Strong
Jere Austin as Tom North
Lionel Belmore as Parson
Gertrude Claire as Elspeth Strong
Mark Fenton as Malcolm

Preservation
A print of The Storm Breaker is preserved at EYE film Institut, aka Filmmuseum, Netherlands.

References

External links

 
 The Storm Breaker at silentera.com

1925 films
1920s English-language films
Silent American drama films
1925 drama films
Universal Pictures films
Films directed by Edward Sloman
American silent feature films
American black-and-white films
1920s American films